= 1969–70 Plunket Shield season =

Cricket tournament in New Zealand

1969–70 Plunket Shield
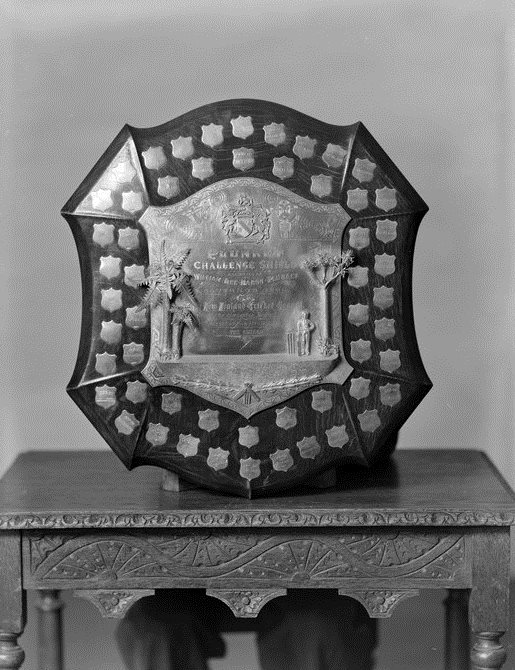
- The Plunket Shield trophy
- Cricket format: First-class
- Tournament format(s): Round-robin
- Champions: Otago (7th title)
- Participants: 6
- Matches: 15

The 1969–70 Plunket Shield season was a tournament of the Plunket Shield, the domestic first-class cricket competition of New Zealand.

Otago won the championship, finishing at the top of the points table at the end of the round-robin tournament between the six first-class sides, Auckland, Canterbury, Central Districts, Northern Districts, Otago and Wellington. Ten points were awarded for a win, five points for having a first innings lead in a draw and one point for a first innings deficit in a draw. The match between Otago and Northern Districts was rained off before both teams could complete one innings each resulting in both teams gaining three competition points.

== Table ==
Below are the Plunket Shield standings for the season:

Team	Played	Won	Lost	Drawn	Points	Net RpW
Otago	5	2	0	3	33	9.203
Central Districts	5	1	0	4	18	1.720
Wellington	5	0	1	4	16	−2.349
Canterbury	5	0	1	4	12	−1.310
Auckland	5	0	1	4	12	−3.766
Northern Districts	5	0	0	5	12	−7.271
